Channichthys panticapaei, the charcoal icefish, is a species of marine ray-finned fish belonging to the family Channichthyidae, the crocodile icefishes. It is endemic to the Kerguelen Islands area in the Southern Ocean. However, it is not targeted and is of no interest to commercial fisheries at present. It is dark gray to uniformly blackish with long first to third dorsal fin spines. This planktivorous (plankton-eating) species likely spawns from June to July, with maturity reached at 30 cm (11.8 inches)  TL / 27 cm (10.6 inches) SL.

References

panticapaei
Fish of the Southern Ocean
Fauna of the Kerguelen Islands
Fish described in 1995